The 2007 Monmouth Hawks football team represented Monmouth University in the 2007 NCAA Division I FCS football season as a member of the Northeast Conference (NEC). The Hawks were led by 15th-year head coach Kevin Callahan and played their home games at Kessler Field. They finished the season 4–6 overall and 3–3 in NEC play to place in a three-way tie for third.

Schedule

References

Monmouth
Monmouth Hawks football seasons
Monmouth Hawks football